The .308 Norma Magnum (7.62×65mmBR) cartridge was created by Nils Kvale at Norma, Sweden. Like the larger .358 Norma Magnum it is based on the .338 Winchester Magnum. It very closely resembled the wildcat .30-338 Magnum cartridge.

Kvale designed a wildcat cartridge, the 8mm Kvale, in 1949. This gave a magnum power cartridge by rechambering surplus 8mm Mauser M98 rifles. The lessons learned from this cartridge were put into the .308 and .358 Norma Magnum.

While still popular, the .308 Norma Magnum has been largely supplanted by the .300 Winchester Magnum, mainly due to the availability of rifles chambered in this caliber.

References

Further reading
Kvale, Nils. "Kulor, krut och älgar". 1963. Norma. Åmotfors, Sweden. ISBN: 9789163329159.

Pistol and rifle cartridges
Magnum rifle cartridges